Argentina sphyraena is a species of fish belonging to the family Argentinidae.

Its native range is Europe and Africa.

References

Argentinidae
Taxa named by Carl Linnaeus
Fish described in 1758